Hamish Kilgour (17 March 1957 – November or December 2022) was a New Zealand musician who co-founded the indie rock band The Clean with his brother David in 1978. Kilgour also co-founded the band Bailter Space in 1987 and later recorded as a solo artist.

Career

Kilgour was born in Christchurch on 17 March 1957.

After the Clean broke up, Kilgour co-founded the Christchurch space rock band Bailter Space in 1987, and recorded the Nelsh Bailter Space EP and Tanker album with the band. In the late 1980s, while on a promotional tour with Bailter Space in New York City, Kilgour decided to remain in the city and leave left the band. While in New York, Kilgour co-founded the band The Mad Scene in the early 1990s with guitarist and bassist Lisa Siegel. The Mad Scene released an EP Falling Over, Spilling Over in 1992 on NYC indie label Homestead Records. Hamish's former label, New Zealand's Flying Nun, released the band's debut album A Trip Thru Monsterland in 1993. After some personnel changes, the band signed to Merge Records and their second album Sealight was released in 1996. 

Kilgour's debut solo album All of It and Nothing was released on Ba Da Bing Records on 16 September 2014.

The Clean, including Kilgour, were inducted into the New Zealand Music Hall of Fame in 2017.

Death
Kilgour was last seen at a shopping centre in Christchurch on 27 November 2022. He was reported missing by his family on 1 December. On 6 December 2022, the police confirmed that Kilgour's body had been found.

Discography

Albums

See also

List of solved missing person cases

Awards

Aotearoa Music Awards
The Aotearoa Music Awards (previously known as New Zealand Music Awards (NZMA)) are an annual awards night celebrating excellence in New Zealand music and have been presented annually since 1965.

! 
|-
| 1992 || Hamish Kilgour for Pink Flying Saucers Over the Southern Alps (various artist) || Album Cover of the Year||  || 
|-
| 2017 || Hamish Kilgour (as part of The Clean) || New Zealand Music Hall of Fame ||  || 
|-

References

External links
 Interview related to "All of It and Nothing" 
 
 

1957 births
2020s missing person cases
2022 deaths
Dunedin Sound musicians
Flying Nun Records artists
Formerly missing people
Male drummers
Merge Records artists
Missing person cases in New Zealand
Musicians from Dunedin
New Zealand drummers
Siltbreeze Records artists
The Clean members